Helmut Theodor Schreyer (4 July 1912 – 12 December 1984) was a German inventor. He is mostly known for his work on the Z3, one of the first computers.

Early life 
Helmut Schreyer was the son of the minister Paul Schreyer and Martha. When his father started to work in a parish in Mosbach, the young Schreyer went to a school there. He earned his Abitur in 1933. He then worked as an intern at AEG.

Career 
Schreyer started to study electronic and telecommunications engineering at the Technical University of Berlin in 1934. He got to know Konrad Zuse in the fraternity AV Motiv in 1935 and then helped him to construct the computer Z1. In 1938 he earned his diploma and then worked as a graduate assistant at Prof. Wilhelm Stäblein's institute. Schreyer belonged, together with Herbert Raabe (1909–2004), to the first assistants of Wilhelm Stäblein, who had worked at AEG's research division until 1936. During WWII Schreyer was not drafted because his work was considered essential to the war effort. Schreyer e.g. worked on detection technology for unexploded ordnance. He then worked on the accelerometer for the V-2-rocket. Schreyer also worked on technology to convert the radar signal into an audio signal which the pilot of a fighter aircraft might recognize.

Helmut Schreyer advised Konrad Zuse to use electrical circuit technology to implement computers, but he first considered it practically infeasible and then could not get the necessary funding. Up to 1942 Schreyer himself built an experimental model of a computer using 100 vacuum tubes, which was lost at the end of the war. Schreyer planned to build a computer memory for 1000 words in 1943, that was to contain several thousand electron tubes, but the war put an end to all larger plans. In 1944 he built an electrical circuit to convert decimal to binary numbers.

After the war Schreyer, who had been a member of the NSDAP,  emigrated with his wife and daughter to Brazil where he became professor at the Instituto Militar de Engenharia in Rio de Janeiro.

Works
 Technische Rechenmaschine, 1939 (i.e. Technical computing machines, cf. Brian Randell, ed.: The origins of digital computers. Selected papers. Springer, Berlin, Heidelberg, 1982).
 Das Röhrenrelais und seine Schaltungstechnik. Berlin Institute of Technology, Dissertation 1941.  (i.e. Vacuum tube relays and circuit technology)
 Patent: Schaltungsanordnung eines elektrischen Kombinationsspeicherwerkes. Patent application on June 11, 1943 (published in December 1955).  (i.e. Circuit layout for combinatorial electronic memory) Espacenet-Link.
 An Experimental Model of an Electronic Computer. IEEE Annals of the History of Computing 12 #3 (July–September 1990): 187-197. (Description of the development and construction of a model to test the feasibility of an electronic computer; written in 1977 about his work during the period 1941-1943.)
 Medidas Em Comunicaçoes
 Circuitos de Comutação (computadores Eletrônicos Digitais), 1966
 Envio Imediato Circuitos de Comutação. Oficina do I.M.E., Rio de Janeiro 1966
 Computadores Eletrônicos Digitais, 1967

References

External links 
Curriculum vitae at the Technical University of Berlin (in German)
Image of Zuse and Schreyer (right side)

1912 births
1984 deaths
20th-century German inventors
German computer scientists
Computer hardware engineers
Nazi Party members
Technical University of Berlin alumni